The Bloody Carnival was the massacre of Székely serfs in February 1596 after their rebellion for the restoration of their freedom. The Székelys rose up because the Diet of Transylvania had refused to restore their freedom. Sigismund Báthory, Prince of Transylvania promised them to restore their freedom if they joined his campaign against the Ottomans in Wallachia in autumn 1595.

References

Sources 

 

History of the Hungarians
Principality of Transylvania (1570–1711)
Székelys